Méryem Oumezdi (born 13 January 1968) is a Moroccan sprinter. She competed in the women's 100 metres at the 1988 Summer Olympics.

References

External links
 

1968 births
Living people
Athletes (track and field) at the 1988 Summer Olympics
Moroccan female sprinters
Olympic athletes of Morocco
Place of birth missing (living people)
Olympic female sprinters